Not OK may refer to:
 "Not OK" (Kygo and Chelsea Cutler song), 2019
 "Not OK" (Peach Tree Rascals song), 2020
 "Not OK!", a 2020 song by Chaz Cardigan
 "Not OK", a 2020 song by Maria Mena
 Not Okay, a 2022 film.